Bellevue is a historic mansion house at 204 Ben Hill Street in LaGrange, Georgia, United States. Built in 1853–1855, it was the home of Senator Benjamin Harvey Hill, and is one of the state's finest examples of Greek Revival architecture. Now a historic house museum, it was designated a National Historic Landmark in 1973, and is a contributing structure in Broad Street Historic District.

Description and history
Bellevue is located in central LaGrange, on an oval parcel located at the north end of Ben Hill Street, and flanked on both sides by McLendon Circle. It is a two-story wood-frame structure with a two-story Greek temple front, featuring six fluted Ionic columns with four-sided capitals, and a heavy multi-level entablature below a dentillated cornice. Set within the temple front is a second-floor balcony with a turned balustrade, and a center entrance recessed in an opening flanked by pilasters and topped by an entablature. Ells extend the house, joining it to what was once a separate kitchen building.

Bellevue, originally a  plantation estate, was established in 1853 by Benjamin Harvey Hill, one of Georgia's leading politicians of the antebellum and Civil War era.  Its architect is only known by his last name, Taylor, and is one Georgia's finest example of antebellum Greek Revival architecture. Hill (1823–82) was a highly regarded orator and politician, who opposed secession in the years prior to the Civil War. When Georgia did secede from the Union, he served in the Senate of the Confederacy, and was opposed to Reconstruction Era legislation after the war. His house is now owned by the LaGrange Women's Club, which offers tours of the house and rentals for special events.

See also
List of National Historic Landmarks in Georgia
National Register of Historic Places listings in Troup County, Georgia

References

External links 
Bellevue official site
City of LaGrange
National Register Bulletin: How To Prepare National Historic Landmark Nominations

National Historic Landmarks in Georgia (U.S. state)
Houses completed in 1855
Historic house museums in Georgia (U.S. state)
Museums in Troup County, Georgia
Houses in Troup County, Georgia
Houses on the National Register of Historic Places in Georgia (U.S. state)
National Register of Historic Places in Troup County, Georgia
Historic district contributing properties in Georgia (U.S. state)
Greek Revival houses in Georgia (U.S. state)